Oleksandr Petrovych Baranivsky (born 28 March 1959 in Khoroshiv Raion, Zhytomyr Oblast) is a Ukrainian politician and agronomist. Baranivsky served as Minister of Agrarian Policy (2005–2006). He was also member of Ukrainian parliament (Verkhovna Rada) (2002–2005, 2006–2007).

First Secretary of the Zhytomyr Regional Committee of the Socialist Party (1998–2005).

Awards
 Order of Merit III class (2010).

References

External links
 Verkhovna Rada

1959 births
Living people
People from Zhytomyr Oblast
Fourth convocation members of the Verkhovna Rada
Fifth convocation members of the Verkhovna Rada
Agriculture ministers of Ukraine
Socialist Party of Ukraine politicians
United Left and Peasants politicians
Recipients of the Order of Merit (Ukraine), 3rd class